Jean Peitevin de Saint André (18 June 1912 – 30 January 1996) was a French equestrian. He competed in two events at the 1952 Summer Olympics.

References

1912 births
1996 deaths
French male equestrians
Olympic equestrians of France
Equestrians at the 1952 Summer Olympics
Sportspeople from Toulouse
20th-century French people